Glenaven is a rural locality in the Toowoomba Region, Queensland, Australia.

Geography 
The land on the eastern edge of the locality is undeveloped. Apart from that, the land is mostly used for grazing on native vegetation with some crop growing. 

The New England Highway enters the locality from the south-east (Pinelands) and exits to the north-west (Emu Creek).

History 
Glenaven Provisional School opened on 21 October 1895. On 1 January 1909 it became Glenaven State School. It closed in 1934. It was on a  site at 160 Kluger Road (corner Djuan Road).

In 1901, a Methodist Church was built in Glenaven at a cost of £100.

The locality was officially named Glenhaven in 1999, but was renamed Glenaven in 2005.

Education 
There are no schools in Glenaven. The nearest primary schools are Haden State School in Haden to the south-west and Crows Nest State School in Crows Nest to the south-east. The nearest secondary schools are Crows Nest State School (to Year 10) and Highfields State Secondary College (to Year 12) in Highfields to the south.

References 

Toowoomba Region
Localities in Queensland